Günther Pankoke (13 August 1925 – 6 December 1999) was a German racing cyclist. He rode in the 1955 Tour de France.

References

External links
 

1925 births
1999 deaths
German male cyclists
Place of birth missing
Sportspeople from Bielefeld
Cyclists from North Rhine-Westphalia